The Women competition at the 2020 World Sprint Speed Skating Championships was held on 28 and 29 February 2020.

Results

500 m
The race started on 28 February at 17:30.

1000 m
The race started on 28 February at 18.53.

500 m
The race started on 29 February at 10:30.

1000 m
The race started on 29 February at 13:08.

Overall standings
After all races.

References

Women